Alexander Nadson (Aliaksandar Nadsan, 8 August 1926 – 15 April 2015) was the Apostolic Visitor for Belarusian Greek-Catholic faithful abroad, scholar, translator and a notable Belarusian émigré social and religious leader.

Early life 
Fr Nadson was born Aliaksandar Bočka in the village of Haradzieja near Niasviž, the Second Polish Republic (nowadays Minsk Region of Belarus) into a middle-class family. His father Anton had served as an officer in the army of the Russian Tsar in the First World War, and had participated in the 1920 anti-Bolsheviks Slutsk Uprising. Nadson studied at the Teacher Training College in Niasviž seminary. In 1944 he emigrated from Belarus, and in 1945 was a soldier in the 2nd Polish Corps fighting in Italy, where he was wounded.

In 1946 along with the Anders army he moved to Great Britain where he studied at the University of London. Nadson was one of the founders of the Association of Belarusians in Great Britain and its chairman in 1951–1953. He was editor of the periodicals Biełarus na čužynie and Na šlachu, and took part in the activities of the Belarusian Christian academic society Ruń and the Belarusian People's Independent Christian Movement.

Later life 
From autumn 1953 he studied at the Pontifical Greek College in Rome. He was ordained priest of the Eastern Rite on 23 November 1958. Fr Nadson "had been guided on to this [ecclesiastical] path by Fr (later Bishop) Ceslaus Sipovich, who himself had been sent by the Vatican to establish a Belarusian Catholic Mission in the UK". In July 1959 Fr Nadson returned to London, where he resumed his activities in organizations of the Belarusian diaspora. It was at this time that the "Belarusian village" in North Finchley, London was beginning to expand. A property was acquired to house a boarding school for the sons of Belarusian immigrants in Western Europe; he was appointed headmaster in 1961.

From 1971 Fr Nadson was the director of the Francis Skaryna Belarusian Library and Museum in London, the largest Belarusian library abroad. Fr Nadson "developed the institution to the point where it could justifiably be regarded as the foremost collection in the world, outside Belarus itself, of books (including many rare publications), maps, journals and artefacts relevant for the study of the complex area east of Poland once known as the Grand Duchy of Lithuania" with "a world-wide reputation" which "attract[ed] scholars from a wide range of countries".

The library also provided Fr Nadson with many opportunities for research. He gave several lectures to the Anglo-Belarusian Society. He published pioneering articles in the Society's Journal of Belarusian Studies on such topics as the life and writings of the early Belarusian Saint Cyril of Turau and a manuscript tefsir (a commentary on the Qur’an) that he had acquired for the library, written in Arabic script by Muslim Tatars living in Belarus who had retained their religion but used Belarusian as their everyday language. He was also a long time editor of the Journal. The high regard in which his scholarship was held was shown by the award in 2008 of an honorary doctorate of the European Humanities University based in Vilnius. Fr Nadson was also very active in translating liturgical texts into Belarusian.

From 1981 he was head of the Belarusian Catholic mission in Great Britain, and from 1986, Apostolic Visitor to all Belarusian Greek-Catholic faithful abroad. He actively supported the recreation of the Greek Catholic Church in Belarus that had been suppressed in that country since the 1830s.

He was the author of several books on the history of Belarus and the head of a Chernobyl charity fund aimed at alleviating the effects of the Chernobyl nuclear disaster of 1986.

Death 
Nadson died at 88 on 15 April 2015 and is buried in St Pancras and Islington Cemetery in East Finchley, North London.

References

External links
 Francis Skaryna Belarusian Library and Museum in London
 Fr. Nadson - Ceslaus Sipovich: The first Belarusian Catholic Bishop in the 20th Century (1914–1981) 
 Fr. Nadson - Princess Magdalena Radzivill and the Greek Catholic Church in Belarus 
 Fr. Nadson - Spiritual Writings of St Cyril of Turau

1926 births
2015 deaths
People from Nesvizh District
People from Nowogródek Voivodeship (1919–1939)
Belarusian Eastern Catholic priests
20th-century Belarusian historians
Belarusian male writers
Byelorussian Home Defence personnel
Polish military personnel of World War II
Belarusian emigrants to England
Naturalised citizens of the United Kingdom
British Eastern Catholics
British religious leaders
British historians
Burials at St Pancras and Islington Cemetery
Eastern Catholic bishops in the United Kingdom
Male non-fiction writers